The NBA Awards was an annual awards show presented by the National Basketball Association (NBA) from 2017 to 2019, created in partnership with Turner Sports and produced by Dick Clark Productions to honor and recognize the league's top performers and accomplishments. Finalists for each individual award were announced during the NBA playoffs on NBA on TNT telecasts. Winners were revealed during the ceremony. Additionally, the open public could decide the winner for fan-voted categories online by voting through the league's official website and on social media.

The ceremony occurred in late June, following the conclusion of the NBA Finals, and were broadcast live on TNT. Hosting duties were shared with the Inside the NBA studio team. Due to the COVID-19 pandemic, the show was not held in 2020 and 2021. Award winners were instead announced on TNT during their coverage of the playoffs.

List of ceremonies

See also
List of National Basketball Association awards

Notes

References

External links

 
National Basketball Association awards